Amicie de Courtenay (1253–1275) was a French noblewoman and a member of the Capetian House of Courtenay, a cadet line of the House of Capet.

Her father was Peter of Courtenay, Lord of Conches and Mehun (1218-1250);  he fell in the Battle of Al Mansurah during the Seventh Crusade. Amicie's mother was Pétronille of Joigny, the daughter of Gaucher de Joigny and Amicie de Montfort.

She married Count Robert II of Artois (1250-1302), together they had three children:
 Mahaut (1268–1329)
 Philip (1269–1298)
 Robert (1271–1272)

References

Sources

House of Capet
1250 births
1275 deaths
French countesses
13th-century French people
13th-century French women